Pseudochorda is a genus of thalloid brown algae including two species.

References

Further reading

Laminariales
Laminariales genera